The  is an earthquake that occurred in central Tottori Prefecture in Japan on October 21, 2016. It measured 6.2 on the Moment magnitude scale. The earthquake left 32 people injured.

Earthquake 
The shock had a maximum intensity of VIII (Severe), and it had a maximum JMA intensity of Shindo 6− (Kurayoshi, Yurihama and Hokuei).

See also 
List of earthquakes in 2016
List of earthquakes in Japan
2000 Tottori earthquake

References

External links 

 平成28年10月21日14時07分頃の鳥取県中部の地震について - 気象庁
 平成28年10月21日鳥取県中部地震記録誌 - 鳥取県

Earthquakes in Japan
2016 earthquakes
October 2016 events in Japan
Earthquakes of the Heisei period
2016 disasters in Japan